The Granger Building is an historic structure located at 964 5th Avenue in the Gaslamp Quarter, San Diego, in the U.S. state of California. It was built in 1904.

History 
The Romanesque-style Granger Building opened in 1904. Over the years, this storied building has served San Diego as a bank, office space, and even played host to animals for the World Famous San Diego Zoo. Today the Granger Building is being transformed into a boutique hotel.

See also
 List of Gaslamp Quarter historic buildings

External links

 

1904 establishments in California
Buildings and structures in San Diego
Commercial buildings completed in 1904
Gaslamp Quarter, San Diego